Agrionympha fuscoapicella is a species of moth belonging to the family Micropterigidae. It was described by George W. Gibbs and Niels P. Kristensen in 2011. It is found in South Africa, where it is known only from Hogsback in the Eastern Cape. It occurs in tall dense rainforest, under the canopy but in light wells and margins where forest floor is damp and periphyton present.

Etymology
The specific name is derived from fuscus (meaning dark) and apex (meaning tip), referring to the blackish-brown wing apex which lacks a subapical band.

References

Endemic moths of South Africa
Micropterigidae
Moths described in 2011
Moths of Africa